Lundy Kiger (born October 4, 1954) is an American politician who served in the Oklahoma House of Representatives from the 3rd district from 2018 to 2020.

References

1954 births
Living people
Republican Party members of the Oklahoma House of Representatives
21st-century American politicians